Mexichromis mariei is a species of colourful sea slug, a dorid nudibranch, a shell-less marine gastropod mollusk in the family Chromodorididae.

Distribution 
Originally described from New Caledonia this species is widespread in the central Indo-Pacific Ocean. Animals from Japan may represent related species.

Description
Mexichromis mariei has a white to pale pink mantle with scattered rounded pink-purple tubercles. The original description describes red spots around the edge of the mantle but there is usually a yellow band which may be slightly broken into patches. The gills are pale pink with a purple line on the exterior rachis. The rhinophores grade from pale pink to purple at the tips.

Ecology

References

Chromodorididae
Gastropods described in 1872